The Andic languages are a branch of the Northeast Caucasian language family. They are often grouped together with the Avar language and (formerly) with the Tsezic (Didoic) languages to form an Avar–Andic (or Avar–Andic–Didoic) branch of that family.

Internal branching 
Schulze (2009) gives the following family tree for the Andic languages:
 Andi (Qwannab)
 Akhvakh–Tindi
 Akhvakh
 Karata–Tindi
 Karata (Kirdi)
 Botlikh–Tindi
 Botlikh
 Godoberi
 Chamalal
 Bagvalal–Tindi
 Bagvalal
 Tindi

References 

 
Northeast Caucasian languages